Bhudsabun Prasaengkaew (born ) is a retired Thai female volleyball player.

She was part of the Thailand women's national volleyball team at the 1998 FIVB Volleyball Women's World Championship in Japan.

References

1972 births
Living people
Bhudsabun Prasaengkaew
Place of birth missing (living people)
Bhudsabun Prasaengkaew